Sergio Peña Solís (born 25 January 1973) is a Mexican suspected drug lord and a former leader in the criminal group Los Zetas, then the armed side of the Gulf Cartel. He was apprehended in Reynosa, Tamaulipas, Mexico, on 14 March 2009.

The government of Mexico had listed Peña Solís as one of its 37 most wanted drug lords and offered the equivalent of over $2 million USD ($15 million Mexican pesos) for information leading to his capture.

Status
Sergio Peña Solís was believed to be the new leader of the Los Zetas group in Reynosa, Mexico, after the former leader Jaime Gonzalez Duran (aka El Hummer) was arrested in the later part of 2008. Peña Solís was known as "El Concord" and used several aliases, including the names of Rene Carlos Solis and Arturo Sanchez Fuentes.

Arrest
Peña Solís was 39 years old at the time of his capture. He was arrested after he tried to flee a police checkpoint in a stolen truck with Texas license plates. He was carrying a false ID card, and was in possession of an AK-47 rifle.

Charges
According to authorities, Peña Solís was recently a leader in the drug cartel organization in the southern Mexican state of Chiapas where he was responsible for bribing the police in the cities of Chiapa de Corzo, Tuxtla Gutierrez, and San Cristobal de las Casas. It has been reported that, when previous Zeta leader of the city of Reynosa Jaime Gonzalez Duran was arrested, Peña Solís was sent to Reynosa lead drug trafficking activities across the border and to fight against police measures to stop the trafficking of illegal drugs.

Kingpin Act sanction
On 24 March 2010, the United States Department of the Treasury sanctioned Peña Solís under the Foreign Narcotics Kingpin Designation Act (sometimes referred to simply as the "Kingpin Act"), for his involvement in drug trafficking along with fifty-three other international criminals and ten foreign entities. The act prohibited U.S. citizens and companies from doing any kind of business activity with him, and virtually froze all his assets in the U.S.

2006 prison escape
In 2003, Mexican authorities issued an arrest warrant against Peña Solís for drug trafficking and subsequently apprehended him and put him into custody. But, on 13 June 2006, Peña Solís escaped from prison with the assistance of Jaime González Durán, alias "El Hummer". Following his escape from prison, Peña Solís was involved in the murder-executions of the tactical head of police and a police officer in Tuxtla Gutierrez, Chiapas. Mexican police also charged him with the 25 July 2008 killing of businessman Marcos Arcia of San Cristobal De Las Casas, Chiapas, Mexico.

Business partners
Peña Solís had an alliance with Miguel Angel Trevino Morales (aka Z-40), Daniel Perez Fojas (aka El Cachetes, which means The Cheeks), Iván Velázquez-Caballero and Sergio Basurto Pena. Peña Solís is a suspect in the failed attempt to free Zeta member Perez-Fojas who was to prison in Guatemala.

See also
 List of Mexico's 37 most-wanted drug lords

External links
PHOTO of Sergio Peña Solís.(Source: http://www.pgje.chiapas.gob.mx/masbuscados/# ) "Los Mas Buscados." Procuraduria General de Justicia del Estado de Chiapas. Tuxla Gutierrez, Chiapas, Mexico

References

1970 births
Mexican crime bosses
Los Zetas
Living people
People from Reynosa
People sanctioned under the Foreign Narcotics Kingpin Designation Act